Asmad (born August 28, 1983) is an Indonesian footballer who currently plays for Persiram Raja Ampat in the Indonesia Super League.

Club statistics

References

External links

1983 births
Association football midfielders
Living people
Indonesian footballers
Liga 1 (Indonesia) players
Persiram Raja Ampat players
Indonesian Premier Division players
Persidafon Dafonsoro players
PSS Sleman players